The Japanese destroyer {{nihongo|Warabi|蕨|}} was one of 21 s built for the Imperial Japanese Navy (IJN) in the late 1910s.

Design and description
The Momi class was designed with higher speed and better seakeeping than the preceding  second-class destroyers. Warabi was powered by two Parsons geared steam turbines, each driving one propeller shaft using steam provided by three Kampon water-tube boilers. Their crew consisted of 110 officers and crewmen.

The main armament of the Momi-class ships consisted of three  Type 3 guns in single mounts; one gun forward of the well deck, one between the two funnels, and the last gun atop the aft superstructure. The guns were numbered '1' to '3' from front to rear. The ships carried two above-water twin sets of  torpedo tubes; one mount was in the well deck between the forward superstructure and the bow gun and the other between the aft funnel and aft superstructure.

Construction and career
Warabi, built at the Fujinagata Shipyards in Osaka, was laid down on October 12, 1920, launched on September 28, 1921 and completed on December 19, 1921. In the collision and sinking, 119 people died.

Wreck
In September 2020 researchers discovered what they concluded is the forward section of Warabi  to the northeast of the Mihonoseki Lighthouse, Shimane Prefecture, noting that the ship had broken in two in the collision,.

Notes

References

1921 ships
Ships built by Fujinagata Shipyards
Momi-class destroyers
Maritime incidents in 1927
Ships sunk in collisions